The name Noru has been used to name four tropical cyclones in the northwestern Pacific Ocean. The name was contributed by South Korea and means a roe deer.
 Tropical Storm Noru (2004) (T0429, 32W) a weak typhoon which barely impacted the Mariana Islands
 Tropical Storm Noru (2011) (T1113, 16W) – merged with the extratropical remnants of Talas.
 Typhoon Noru (2017) (T1705, 07W) – impacted Japan and is tied as the second longest-lasting northwest Pacific tropical cyclone on record
 Typhoon Noru (2022) (T2216, 18W, Karding) – a Category 5-equivalent typhoon that impacted the Philippines and Vietnam.

The name Noru was requested to be retired after the 2022 season.

Pacific typhoon set index articles